Ascalaph Designer is a computer program for general purpose molecular modelling for molecular design and simulations. It provides a graphical environment for the common programs of quantum and classical molecular modelling ORCA, NWChem, Firefly, CP2K and MDynaMix 
. The molecular mechanics calculations cover model building, energy optimizations and molecular dynamics. Firefly (formerly named PC GAMESS) covers a wide range of quantum chemistry methods. Ascalaph Designer is free and open-source software, released under the GNU General Public License, version 2 (GPLv2).

Key features

Uses

See also
 List of software for molecular mechanics modeling
 Molecular design software
 Molecule editor
 Abalone

References

External links 
 
 SourceForge
 Twitter

Computational chemistry software
Free science software
Molecular modelling software
Molecular dynamics software